Ivan Tomičić (born 1 March 1993 in Split) is a former Croatian football midfielder which is currently manager of RNK Split.

Club career
Ivan Tomičić joined Hajduk Split's youth academy in 2007 from the lower tier side Kamen Ivanbegovina. A youth international, he joined the Hajduk senior team in 2012, and was sent to the club's feeder team NK Primorac 1929 in the summer of 2012. In the summer of 2013 Ivan went on loan in HNK Segesta, returning to Hajduk for the second part of the season. Tomičić spent the 2014/15 season on loans in Italy, at Serie C sides Mantova F.C. and Ischia before returning to Croatia. Following another period at Hajduk's reserve team, Tomičić was released from his contract and joined second-tier NK Imotski. After a year at the club, Tomičić returned to the top tier of Croatian football, signing for RNK Split. Following the club's relegation, Tomičić joined Inter Zaprešić, but left the club at the winter break. Following some trials abroad, Tomičić another Prva HNL team, NK Rudeš, in the summer of 2018, on a year-long contract.

References

External links
Ivan Tomičić profile at hajduk.hr

1993 births
Living people
Footballers from Split, Croatia
Association football midfielders
Association football forwards
Croatian footballers
Croatia youth international footballers
HNK Hajduk Split players
NK Primorac 1929 players
NK Solin players
HNK Segesta players
Mantova 1911 players
S.S. Ischia Isolaverde players
HNK Hajduk Split II players
NK Imotski players
RNK Split players
NK Inter Zaprešić players
NK Rudeš players
NK Lučko players
Croatian Football League players
First Football League (Croatia) players
Serie C players
Croatian expatriate footballers
Expatriate footballers in Italy
Croatian expatriate sportspeople in Italy
Croatian football managers
RNK Split managers